Streyella anguinella is a moth of the family Gelechiidae. It is found from south-western Europe to the southern part of the Ural Mountains and the Lower Volga. Outside of Europe, it is found in Turkey, the Near East and North Africa.

References

Moths described in 1861
Litini
Moths of Europe
Moths of Asia